Obsolescence is the fourth album by death metal band Abysmal Dawn. It was released on October 24, 2014 by Relapse Records. It's also to be considered as a follow-up album from their previous release Leveling the Plane of Existence. A music video was made for "Inanimate".

Track listing

Personnel
Abysmal Dawn
Charles Elliott – guitars, vocals
Andy Nelson – guitars
Scott Fuller – drums
Eliseo Garcia – bass

Additional musicians
Christian Münzner – guitar on "Perfecting Slavery"
Bobby Koelble – guitar on "Devouring the Essence of God"

Production
Pär Olofsson – cover art
Mike Bear – producer
John Haddad – mixing, mastering

References

2014 albums
Relapse Records albums
Abysmal Dawn albums
Albums with cover art by Pär Olofsson